Chlorodiloma is a genus of sea snails, marine gastropod mollusks in the family Trochidae, the top snails.

Description
The shell in this genus is like the shell of Diloma but rather more conical and less nacreous. The coloration is variegated, consisting of fine lines of dark on a lighter ground. The columella is generally green. The umbilicus is perforate or subperforate.

Species
Species within the genus Chlorodiloma include:
 Chlorodiloma adelaidae (Philippi, 1849)
 Chlorodiloma crinita (Philippi, 1849)
 Chlorodiloma millelineata (Bonnet, 1864)
 Chlorodiloma odontis (W. Wood, 1828)

References

 Hutton, 1884; Proceedings of the Linnean Society of New South Wales, 9: 368 (invalid: junior homonym of Latona Schumacher, 1817 [Bivalvia])
 Cotton, B.C., 1959. South Australian Mollusca. Archaeogastropoda. Govt. Printer, Adelaide

External links
 To GenBank 
 To World Register of Marine Species

 
Trochidae
Gastropod genera